Locket Chatterjee (born 4 December 1974) is an Indian actress, politician and Member of Parliament for Hooghly (Lok Sabha constituency), West Bengal, India. She is also a classical dancer. She completed her training in Bharat Natyam, Kathakali, Manipuri and Creative, but is better known as an actress. Previously, she was the state president of BJP Mahila Morcha, the women's wing of the Bharatiya Janata Party in West Bengal. Now she is a General Secretary of Bharatiya Janata Party, West Bengal.

Early life
Chatterjee's father Sri. Anil Chatterjee was a purohit of Dakshineswar Kali Temple as was her grandfather. Her mother took her to dance school. Chatterjee went abroad with the Mamata Shankar ballet troupe when she was a class VIII student. She grew up by the Maa Ganga (popular as Hooghly) on the northern outskirts of Calcutta's Dakshineswar area.

She later studied at Jogamaya Devi College, affiliated to the University of Calcutta.

Filmography

Films
 Sannyasi Deshonayok (2020)
 Kiriti Roy (2016)
 Gogoler Kirti (2014)
 Angurlata (upcoming)
 Obhishopto Nighty (2014)
 Kapurush Mohapurush (2013)
 Oh Henry! (2013)
 Chora Bali (2012)
 Jibaner Rang (2012)
 Kayekta Meyer Galpo (2012), directed by Subrata Sen 
 Le Halua Le (2012)
 Goraay Gondogol (2012)
 Khokababu (2012)
 Streetlight (2011), directed by Animesh Roy; Chatterjee played struggling actress Mitali, a wife and mother
 Gosaibaganer Bhoot (2011)
 Bye Bye Bangkok (2011)
 Hello Memsaheb (2011)
 Uro Chithi (2011)
 Fighter (2011)
 Poran Jaye Jolia Re (2009), as Raj's aunt
 Greptar (2007)
 Chander Bari (2007)
 Kranti (2006)
 Guru (2005)
 Shubhodrishti (2005)
 Tyag (2004)
 Badsha the King (2004)
 Agni (2004)
 Paribar (2004)
 Mayer Anchal (2003)
 Ektu Chhoa (2002)

Television
 Maa Manasha (ETV Bangla)
 Bhalobasha Theke Jaye (ETV Bangla)
 Behula as Sumitra Behula's mother (later replaced by Subhadra Chakraborty Mukherjee) (Star Jalsha)
 Durgeshnandini, a TV adaptation of Bankim Chandra Chattopadhyay's novel, directed by Tarun Majumdar. Locket played the role of Munnibai.

Awards 
 Kalakar Awards
 Nominated, Filmfare Award for Best Actor Supporting Role (Female) – Bengali for Nayika Sangbad (directed by Bappaditya Bandopadhyay and edited by Dipak Mandal 2014)

Political career
Locket Chatterjee forayed into politics as a member of AITC. She severed ties with AITC and joined BJP in 2015. She contested 2016 assembly elections from Mayureshwar in West Bengal but lost to Abhijit Roy of AITC. In 2017 she replaced Roopa Ganguly as the president of BJP Mahila Morcha in West Bengal.

Member of Parliament
She contested the 2019 Lok Sabha elections from Hoogly Lok Sabha seat against Ratna De and won getting 6,71,448 (46.06%) votes.

On 13 September 2019, she was selected as a Member of Standing Committee on Information Technology and on 9 October 2019 onwards she's serving as Member of Committee on Empowerment of Women.

In 2021 West Bengal Legislative Assembly Election she contested from Chunchura Seat and lost by whopping 18,879 votes to TMC candidate Asit Mazumdar.

See also 

 Sonali Chowdhury
 Bidipta Chakraborty

References

External links
 

Bengali actresses
Indian female dancers
Jogamaya Devi College alumni
University of Calcutta alumni
Kalakar Awards winners
Indian film actresses
Indian television actresses
Actresses in Bengali cinema
1973 births
Performers of Indian classical dance
Lok Sabha members from West Bengal
West Bengal politicians
Living people
Bharatiya Janata Party politicians from West Bengal
Dancers from West Bengal
21st-century Indian actresses
Indian actor-politicians
Actresses from Kolkata
Politicians from Kolkata
Women in West Bengal politics
Women members of the Lok Sabha
India MPs 2019–present
21st-century Indian politicians
21st-century Indian women politicians